Parliamentary elections were held in Mongolia on 19 June 1977. At the time, the country was a one-party state under the rule of the Mongolian People's Revolutionary Party. The MPRP won 328 of the 354 seats, with the remaining 26 seats going to non-party candidates, who had been chosen by the MPRP due to their social status. Voter turnout was reported to be 100%, with only one of the 694,855 registered voters failing to cast a ballot.

Results

References

Mongolia
1977 in Mongolia
Elections in Mongolia
One-party elections
June 1977 events in Asia
Election and referendum articles with incomplete results